West Virginia's 11th Senate district is one of 17 districts in the West Virginia Senate. It is currently represented by Republicans Bill Hamilton and Robert Karnes. All districts in the West Virginia Senate elect two members to staggered four-year terms.

Geography
District 11 covers all of Nicholas, Pendleton, Pocahontas, Randolph, Upshur, and Webster Counties, as well as some of southern Grant County, in the eastern part of the state. Communities within the district include Richwood, Summersville, Craigsville, Webster Springs, Marlinton, Buckhannon, Elkins, Franklin, and Petersburg.

The district overlaps with the state's 1st, 2nd, and 3rd congressional districts, and with the 32nd, 41st, 43rd, 44th, 45th, 46th, 54th, and 55th districts of the West Virginia House of Delegates. It borders the state of Virginia. At over 4,400 square miles, it is by far the largest district in the Senate.

Recent election results

2022

Historical election results

2020

2018

2016

2014

2012

Federal and statewide results in District 11

References

11
Grant County, West Virginia
Nicholas County, West Virginia
Pendleton County, West Virginia
Pocahontas County, West Virginia
Randolph County, West Virginia
Upshur County, West Virginia
Webster County, West Virginia